Yards after catch (YAC) is a gridiron football statistical measure of the distance gained by a receiver after catching a pass. Specifically, it is the forward yardage gained from the spot of the reception until the receiver is downed, runs out of bounds, scores, or loses the ball.

See also
Glossary of American football

References
  

American football terminology